Syrian General Organization of Books is a Syrian organization based in Damascus and affiliated with the Ministry of Culture, and it was founded by law on 19 February 2006 in Damascus. The organization functions as a Publishing house and aims to "contribute in improving the intellectual and cultural movements" in Syria and to "introduce the Syrian Arab society with local and Arab intellectual, cultural and literary movements and trends, and to develop intellectual, national, and humanitarian perceptions and rationality in thinking".

External links 
The organization's official website in Arabic

References 

2006 establishments in Syria